Shale is a surname. Notable people by that name include:

 Christopher Shale (1954–2011), British businessman and Conservative Party politician
 David Shale (1932–2016), New Zealander-American mathematician
 Dennis Shale (1948–2017), emeritus professor of respiratory medicine
 Kerry Shale (born 1958), Canadian actor
 Tom Shale (1864–1953), English comic actor

See also
 Shale (disambiguation)
 Shales (surname)